John Paul Fruttero and Raven Klaasen won the first edition of the tournament by defeating Hsieh Cheng-peng and Lee Hsin-han 6–7(6–8), 7–5, [10–8] in the final.

Seeds

Draw

Draw

References
 Main Draw

OEC Kaohsiung - Doubles
2012 Doubles
2012 in Taiwanese tennis